Olivar Asselin (November 8, 1874 – April 18, 1937) was a writer and journalist in Quebec, Canada. He was a prominent nationalist, pamphleteer and polemist.

Biography 
Asselin was born in Saint-Hilarion, Charlevoix, Quebec. His name is a combination of the French first name "Olivier" and the last name of Latin American independence leader Simón Bolívar.

He did his primary studies in a Sainte-Flavie school (near Rimouski) and his secondary studies at the Séminaire de Rimouski.

For financial reasons, his family emigrated to the United States in 1891. After a while working at the Coton Mills there, he worked for numerous newspapers in what was then called the "French Canadian" community. He was first journalist for Le Protecteur Canadien of Fall River, in 1894. A year later, he was editor of Le National  of Lowell, Massachusetts (notorious as an emigration target for Quebecers of the day) and Le Jean-Baptiste of Pawtucket, Rhode Island. From 1896 to 1898, he was editorial secretary at La Tribune of Woonsocket.

During the Spanish–American War, he undertook a first brief military participation, from 1898 to 1899. Demobilized in 1899, he moved to Montreal and contributed to various papers, including Les Débats.

On August 3, 1902, he married Alice Le Bouthillier.

From 1901 to 1903, he was secretary to Minister of Colonization Lomer Gouin. He stood as a nationalist candidate in Terrebonne during the 1904 election, then in Saint-James during the 1911 election.

In 1907, after a session of the Legislative Assembly of Quebec had ended, he came down from the press gallery to confront Louis-Alexandre Taschereau, Minister of The Public Works, and future Premier of Quebec, on the Assembly floor. He was upset over an allegation the Minister supposedly made about him during the session, implicating him in an affair over a false telegram. Asselin told him it was false, but Taschereau refused to admit he made such an allegation. Asselin slapped him in the face, earning him a stay in jail. The imprisonment was notably criticized by Henri Bourassa.

From 1902 to 1910, he worked closely with Henri Bourassa and collaborated with him in the founding of Le Devoir in 1910. He was President of the Saint-Jean-Baptiste Society of Montreal from 1913 to 1914. A nationalist militant, he set up the Ligue nationaliste in March 1903 and launched the newspaper Le Nationaliste a year later. It is during this time that he takes on him to defend the settlers right to cut trees and provide information to the Commission de la colonisation of 1904. In 1905, he began a campaign in favour of public compulsory education (it would become law under Premier Adélard Godbout in the 1940s).

The November 26, 1915, Sir Sam Hughes, Minister of Militia and Defence, offered Asselin the honorary rank of Colonel, which entailed raising a battalion for the Canadian Expeditionary Force. Asselin recruited men to form the 163rd (Canadien-Francais) Battalion, CEF, known as the "Poils-aux-pattes", made up of French-Canadian volunteers, and placed them under the command of Captain Henri Desrosiers, accepting instead the rank of Major.

After training in Bermuda, the 163rd Battalion made its way to England, disembarking in December 1916, where the battalion was quickly dismantled and used to reinforce other depleted sections. Transferred to the 22nd Battalion, CEF, Asselin participated in the Battle of Vimy Ridge and the Battle of Acheville. However, he was later removed from the front after contracting trench fever.

Alternately speaker and military attaché, Asselin found himself as a member of the Canadian Delegation at the Paris Peace Conference of 1918, which led to the Treaty of Versailles and the end of World War I.

Asselin received the Légion d'honneur from France in 1919.

In 1930, he became the editor-in-chief of Le Canada and founded, five years later, his own newspapers, named L'Ordre and La Renaissance.

Olivar Asselin died in 1937, in Montreal, at the age of 62. He was entombed at the Notre Dame des Neiges Cemetery in Montreal.

See also 
List of presidents of the Saint-Jean-Baptiste Society of Montreal
Quebec nationalism

Notes

References 
 Hélène Pelletier-Baillargeon. "Asselin, Olivar", in Dictionary of Canadian Biography Online, University of Toronto and Université Laval, 2000
 Olivar Asselin, A Quebec view of Canadian nationalism: an essay by a dyed-in-the-wool French-Canadian on the best means of ensuring the greatness of the Canadian fatherland, 1909, 23,4 x 15,6 x 0,5 cm — Reprints from the collection of the University of Michigan Library: Book on Demand

In French
 Olivar Asselin, Liberté de pensée (préf. Robert Lahaise), Montréal : Typo, 1997, 160 p ; 
 Claude-Henri Grignon, Olivar Asselin, le pamphlétaire maudit (dir. Pierre Grignon; préf. Victor-Lévy Beaulieu), Trois-Pistoles : Éditions Trois-Pistoles, 2007, 342 p ; 
 Hélène Pelletier-Baillargeon, Olivar Asselin et son temps,
 [Vol 1] Le militant, Montréal : Fides, 1996, 780 p (with an index) ; 
 [Vol 2] Le volontaire, Montréal : Fides, 2001, 328 p (with an index) ; 
 [Vol 3] Le maître, Montréal : Fides, 2010, 416 p (with an index) ; 
 Denis Labarre, Olivar Asselin, Montréal : Lidec, collection « Célébrités canadiennes », 1991, 53 p, 22 cm ; 
 Marcel-Aimé Gagnon,
 [Vol 1] La vie orageuse d'Olivar Asselin, Montréal : Les Éditions de l'Homme, 1962, 302 p
 [Vol 2] La vie orageuse d'Olivar Asselin : 1914–1937 (préf. Lionel Groulx), Montréal : Les Éditions de l'Homme, 1962 
 Marcel-Aimé Gagnon, Olivar Asselin toujours vivant (préf. Willie Chevalier), Montréal : Presses de l'Université du Québec, 1974, 215 p ; 
 Hermas Bastien, Olivar Asselin, Montréal : B. Valiquette, 1938, 220 p
 Joseph Gauvreau, Olivar Asselin, précurseur d'Action française, le plus grand de nos journalistes, 1875–1937, s.n., 1937, 46 p

External links 
 "12e législature, 1re session: Analyse des journaux et des sources" at the National Assembly of Quebec website
 "Acteurs de notre histoire"

1874 births
1937 deaths
Journalists from Quebec
Recipients of the Legion of Honour
Presidents of the Saint-Jean-Baptiste Society of Montreal
Canadian Expeditionary Force officers
People from Capitale-Nationale
Burials at Notre Dame des Neiges Cemetery